Internally displaced person camps in Borno State, Nigeria were centers accommodating Nigerians who had been forced to flee their homes but remain within the country's borders. Displaced persons camps in Maiduguri accommodated from 120,000 to 130,000 people, while those in local government areas ranged above 400,000. There were over two million displaced persons in the state. Internal Displacement Monitoring Centre (IDMC) suggested the figure of internally displaced persons in the state to be 1,434,149, the highest in Northern Nigeria.

2016 
Millions of people became homeless as a result of the jihadist terrorist group Boko Haram's insurgency, which centres on Borno and began in 2009. Internally Displaced Persons (IDP) camps remained 32 in Borno, 16 of which were located in Maiduguri, while 16 were in local government areas.

2017 
Kashim Shettima, the state's governor, said all IDP camps in the state would be closed down by 29 May 2017 because "it is becoming a problem on their own."

In January, the Air Force mistakenly bombed an IDP camp in Rann. In March, Boko Haram bombed an IDP camp in Maiduguri.

References 

21st century in Borno State
Boko Haram insurgency 
Internally displaced persons